Agapetus (beloved) may refer to:

 Agapetus (caddisfly), a genus of caddisflies
 List of Agapetus species
 Agapetus (deacon), a deacon of the church of Hagia Sophia in Constantinople
 Agapetus (physician), ancient Greek doctor
 Pope Agapetus I (died 536)
 Pope Agapetus II (died 955)
 Agapetus of the Kiev Caves (died 1095), saint of the Eastern Orthodox Church
 John IX Agapetus (died 1134), Patriarch of Constantinople
 Agapetus, pen name of Yrjö Soini (1896–1975), Finnish journalist, novelist and playwright

See also 
 Saint Agapitus (disambiguation)

Greek masculine given names